Hunter Paisami (born 10 April 1998) is a Samoa-born Australian rugby union player who plays for the  in the Super Rugby competition.  His position of choice is centre.

Paisami joined the  ahead of the 2020 Super Rugby season, and made his debut for Australia at the end of the 2020 season.

Super Rugby statistics

References

External links
 Hunter Paisami | Rugby Database Profile

Australian rugby union players
Australian sportspeople of Samoan descent
1998 births
Living people
Australia international rugby union players
Rugby union centres
Melbourne Rebels players
Melbourne Rising players
Brisbane City (rugby union) players
Queensland Reds players